David Adolph Constant Artz (The Hague, 1837 – The Hague, 1890)  was a 19th-century Dutch painter and collector who associated with some members of the Hague School.

Biography
From 1855 to 1864 Artz trained with J.H. Egenberger and Louis Royer at the Amsterdam Academie. There he met Jozef Israëls, whose fishing subjects were to be a lasting source of inspiration for Artz. He worked with Israëls in Zandvoort in 1859. Unlike Israëls, however, Artz depicted only the more cheerful sides of the fisherman's life.

From 1855 to 1864 he was a member of the Rijksakademie van beeldende kunsten in Amsterdam. Technically, he distinguished himself from Israëls in his use of sharp outlines and bright colour. Between 1866 and 1874 Artz stayed in Paris where he set up his own studio at the suggestion of Courbet.

In Paris he maintained close contacts with his colleagues Jacob Maris and Frederik Hendrik Kaemmerer as well as the art dealer Goupil & Cie. During this period Artz produced mainly fashionable genre scenes and a number of Japanese subjects. His control over line and colour became more powerful.

In 1874 he returned to The Hague where he was a member of the Hollandsche Teekenmaatschappij and in 1879 he was awarded the Order of the Oak Crown by William III of the Netherlands.

Selected paintings

References

External links

1837 births
1890 deaths
19th-century Dutch painters
Dutch male painters
Hague School
Artists from The Hague
19th-century Dutch male artists